Asura conjunctana is a moth of the family Erebidae. It is found in India.

References

conjunctana
Moths described in 1866
Moths of Asia